Dirty Hands is a 2008 political drama. The story shows war's cyclical nature and the psychological and human destruction ultimately caused to both sides.

Plot
Five Middle Eastern captives fight to retain their sanity and dignity in the face of their American interrogators, who in turn struggle with demons of their own.

Cast and crew
 Consultant: U.S. Army Interrogator Colonel Robert Klein (Army interrogator in Iraq and Afghanistan; combat veteran in Iraq and Panama)
 Casting Director: Mali Finn (The film was one of Finn's last projects as casting director before her retirement.)

Screenplay awards and nominations
 Media Arts Fellowships Screenplay nominee (2007)
 Tribeca Film Festival's All-Access Screenplay nominee (2005)
 Roy W. Dean Grant Screenplay finalist (2005)

References

External links

 Dirty Hands screenplay, 
 Tribeca Film Institute 
 Guerrasio, Jason (February 1, 2006) - indieWIRE article

2008 films
American prison films
American independent films
2008 drama films
American war drama films
2000s English-language films
2000s American films